The Violet Bank Historic District encompasses a historic streetcar suburban area of Colonial Heights, Virginia. The area, originally part of the large Violet Bank plantation, was platted and subdivided in the early 20th century, with development restrictions that resulted in a significant uniformity of layout within the subdivisions. The district includes the original Violet Bank plantation house, now a museum.

The district was listed on the National Register of Historic Places in 2015.

See also
National Register of Historic Places listings in Colonial Heights, Virginia

References

Historic districts on the National Register of Historic Places in Virginia
Buildings and structures in Colonial Heights, Virginia
National Register of Historic Places in Colonial Heights, Virginia